Hangna is a village in the Shan State of Myanmar. Hangna is close to the Salween River. The nearest airport is Myitkyina which is located 64.7 km north of Hangna.

References 

Shan State
Villages in Myanmar